Maynard '62 is an album released by Canadian jazz trumpeter Maynard Ferguson featuring tracks recorded in late 1961 and originally released on the Roulette label.

Reception

AllMusic awarded the album 3 stars.

Track listing
 "Have You Met Miss Jones?" (Richard Rodgers, Lorenz Hart) – 2:28
 "Maria" (Leonard Bernstein, Stephen Sondheim) – 3:02
 "Zip 'n' Zap" (Al Gilbert) – 2:52
 "Lazy Afternoon" (Jerome Moross, John La Touche) – 4:17
 "Go East Young Man" (Slide Hampton) – 5:45
 "This Is My Lucky Day" (Ray Henderson, Buddy DeSylva, Lew Brown) – 2:25
 ""X" Stream" (Jaki Byard) – 3:10
 "Four" (Miles Davis) – 3:32
 "Pretty Little Nieda" (Rolf Ericson) – 5:46
 "'Round About the Blues" (Don Sebesky) – 4:16
Recorded in New York City on June 20, 1961 (track 10) and December 1961 (tracks 1-9)

Personnel 
Maynard Ferguson – trumpet, trombone
Bill Berry (track 10), Chet Ferretti, Nat Pavone (tracks 1-9), Don Rader – trumpet
Slide Hampton (tracks 1-9), Kenny Rupp, Ray Winslow (track 10) – trombone
Lanny Morgan – alto saxophone, flute
Willie Maiden – tenor saxophone, clarinet
Don Menza – tenor saxophone, soprano saxophone, flute
Frank Hittner – baritone saxophone, bass clarinet
Mike Abene (tracks 1-9), Jaki Byard (track 10) – piano
Linc Milliman (tracks 1-9), John Neves (track 10) – bass
Rufus Jones – drums
Jaki Byard, Slide Hampton, Willie Maiden, Don Sebesky, Ernie Wilkins – arrangers

References 

1962 albums
Maynard Ferguson albums
Roulette Records albums
Albums produced by Teddy Reig
Albums arranged by Slide Hampton
Albums arranged by Ernie Wilkins
Albums arranged by Don Sebesky